NUBC May refer to:

 National Uniform Billing Committee
 Newcastle University Boat Club
 Nottingham University Boat Club